Gabriel Daniel (8 February 1649 – 23 June 1728) was a French Jesuit historian.

Biography

Born in Rouen, he was educated by the Jesuits, entered the order at the age of eighteen, and became superior at Paris.

Works

He is best known by his Histoire de France depuis l'établissement de la monarchie française (first complete edition, 1713), which was republished in 1720, 1721, 1725, 1742, and (the last edition, with notes by Henri Griffet) 1755–1760. Daniel published an abridgment in 1724 (English trans., 1726), and another abridgment was published by Dorival in 1751.

Though full of prejudices which affect his accuracy, Daniel had the advantage of consulting valuable original sources. His Histoire de la milice française, etc. (1721) is superior to his Histoire de France.  Daniel also wrote a reply to Pascal's Provincial Letters, entitled Entretiens de Cleanthe et d'Eudoxe sur les lettres provinciales (1694); two treatises on Descartes' theory as to the intelligence of the lower animals, and other works.

Notes

References
 This work in turn cites:
Carlos Sommervogel, Bibliothèque de la Compagnie de Jesus, t. ii.

1649 births
1728 deaths
17th-century French Jesuits
Catholic casuists
18th-century French historians
18th-century French Jesuits
French male non-fiction writers
French librarians